Douglas Township is a township in Polk County, Iowa, United States.

History
Douglas Township was established in 1857. It is named for Stephen A. Douglas.

References

Townships in Polk County, Iowa
Townships in Iowa
1857 establishments in Iowa
Populated places established in 1857